Scott Barham Atchison (born March 29, 1976) is an American former Major League Baseball (MLB) pitcher who played for the Seattle Mariners, San Francisco Giants, Boston Red Sox, New York Mets and Cleveland Indians between 2004 and 2015. He also played in Nippon Professional Baseball (NPB) for the Hanshin Tigers and later served as the bullpen coach for the Cleveland Indians for the 2018 and 2019 seasons.

Amateur career
Atchison graduated from McCullough High School in The Woodlands, Texas. He was originally drafted by the Seattle Mariners in the 36th round of the  amateur draft but chose to attend Texas Christian University, where he received his degree in general studies. In 1996, he played collegiate summer baseball with the Wareham Gatemen of the Cape Cod Baseball League.

Professional career

Seattle Mariners
Atchison was drafted again by the Mariners in the 49th round of the  amateur draft and signed with the team in May . He spent five years playing for minor league affiliates of the Mariners and made his debut in the Majors on July 31, 2004. He spent the 2004 and  seasons splitting his time between the Mariners and the Mariners' minor league affiliates, appearing in 31 games over two years. In , he played the entire season in the minors.

San Francisco Giants
In , he signed with the San Francisco Giants and appeared in 22 games. At the end of the season, he refused an assignment from the Giants to the Fresno Grizzlies and became a free agent.

Hanshin Tigers

He signed a minor league contract with the Boston Red Sox on December 7, 2007, but was released and signed a contract with the NPB's Hanshin Tigers on December 20. In January 2008, it was announced that the Red Sox had sold Atchison's contract to the Hanshin Tigers.

Boston Red Sox
On December 7, 2009, Atchison signed a one-year, incentive laden contract with the Red Sox. Atchison was recalled by the Red Sox on May 5, 2011. On May 20, 2011, Atchison notched his 1st ever career save against the Cubs. On July 15, 2012, the Red Sox placed him on the 15-day disabled list because of a torn ulnar collateral ligament in his right elbow, retroactive to July 14. On August 16 he was transferred to the 60-day disabled list to make roster space for newly acquired pitcher, Pedro Beato. Atchison returned to the active roster on September 12.

On November 30, 2012, Atchison was non-tendered, and became a free agent.

New York Mets
On January 29, 2013, Atchison signed a minor league contract with the New York Mets. On June 18, 2013, Atchison was activated from the disabled list to help out the bullpen. He became a free agent on December 2, 2013, after being non-tendered.

Cleveland Indians
Atchison signed a minor league deal with the Cleveland Indians on January 6, 2014. He signed a one-year extension with a team option on August 19, 2014.

With the Indians in 2014, Atchison finished 6–0 with a 2.75 ERA. He pitched in 70 games.

Atchison was designated for assignment on June 23, 2015. He was released by the Indians on June 28, 2015.

Minnesota Twins
On July 4, 2015, Atchison signed a minor league deal with the Twins. He was released on July 15, 2015.

Coaching career
After serving for two years as the Cleveland Indians' advance scout coordinator, Atchison was hired by the Indians as their bullpen coach on November 2, 2017.

Atchison was fired by the Indians on October 2, 2019.

Pitching style
Atchison threw a four-seam fastball in the 90-94 mph range, a slider in the mid-high 80's, and a curveball in the high 70's. On very rare occasions, a changeup to left-handed hitters.

Personal life
Atchison is married to Sarah. Their daughter Callie was born on October 23, 2007 with TAR syndrome.

References

External links

1976 births
Living people
Akron RubberDucks players
American expatriate baseball players in Japan
Arizona League Mariners players
Baseball players from Texas
Boston Red Sox players
Binghamton Mets players
Cardenales de Lara players
American expatriate baseball players in Venezuela
Chattanooga Lookouts players
Cleveland Indians coaches
Cleveland Indians executives
Cleveland Indians players
Fresno Grizzlies players
Gulf Coast Mets players
Hanshin Tigers players
Lancaster JetHawks players
Major League Baseball bullpen coaches
Major League Baseball pitchers
New York Mets players
Pawtucket Red Sox players
Sportspeople from Denton, Texas
San Antonio Missions players
San Francisco Giants players
Seattle Mariners players
St. Lucie Mets players
Tacoma Rainiers players
TCU Horned Frogs baseball players
Wareham Gatemen players
Wisconsin Timber Rattlers players